Occidenthella is a genus of sea slugs, specifically aeolid nudibranchs, in the family Flabellinidae. The only described species is Occidenthella athadona, a combination named in 2017. It was originally described as Coryphella athadona in 1875. The genus name Occidenthella, from occidens, meaning "west" in Latin, refers to its distribution in the Western Pacific Ocean.

In the 2017 publication, it was placed in the reinstated family Coryphellidae.

Notes

References

Coryphellidae
Gastropod genera